The 2019 Golden Gala was the 39th edition of the annual outdoor track and field meeting in Rome, Italy. Held on 6 June at the Stadio Olimpico, it was the fourth leg of the 2019 IAAF Diamond League – the highest level international track and field circuit. 27 events total were contested with 14 of them being point-scoring Diamond League disciplines.

A total of seven world leads and two meeting records were set at the competition. In the men's sprints, 400 metres world leader Michael Norman won in a meeting record and world leading time of 19.72 seconds in the 200 metres race, narrowly holding onto a shrinking lead ahead of reigning Diamond League champion Noah Lyles who placed second in a seasonal debut of 19.72 seconds. Norman's time was a personal best and broke Lyles' winning streak that went back to the 2016 US Olympic Trials.

In the men's distance events, Donavan Brazier passed Nijel Amos less than a meter before the finish line in the 800 metres race, winning in a world leading 1:43.63 ahead of Amos' 1:43.65. Benjamin Kigen won a close race with Getnet Wale in the 3000 metres steeplechase, setting a personal best and world leading time of 8:06.13 ahead of Wale's 8:06.83, also a personal best. In a fast 5000 metres race in which six competitors finished in less than 12:59 and 18 personal or seasonal bests were achieved, Telahun Haile Bekele narrowly defeated reigning Diamond League champion Selemon Barega in a personal best and world leading 12:52.98. Barega finished second in a seasonal best of 12:53.04.

The shot put meeting record was broken by Konrad Bukowiecki with a personal best mark of 21.97 metres, and the world leading mark in the high jump of 2.31 metres was matched by Bohdan Bondarenko.

On the women's side, a Swedish record was set in the pole vault by Angelica Bengtsson with a mark of 4.76 metres, defeating indoor world champion Sandi Morris who placed second jointly with Robeilys Peinado (4.66 metres). The 2016 Olympic champion over 100 metres and 200 metres, Elaine Thompson, came back from a slower start in the 100 metres race to defeat Dina Asher-Smith in the fastest time in the world since 2017, 10.89 seconds. Asher-Smith, who had defeated Thompson in the Stockholm Diamond League over 200 metres earlier that year, took second with a seasonal debut of 10.94 seconds.

In the 1500 metres, Genzebe Dibaba ran her fastest time since setting the world record in 2015, narrowly holding off Laura Muir with a world leading 3:56.28. Muir herself ran the second fastest time in her career, 3:56.73, only behind her British record to place second. Malaika Mihambo defeated Olympic champion jumpers Brittney Reese and Caterine Ibargüen in the long jump with a personal best and world leading 7.07 metres, her first mark seven metres or more.

Diamond League results
Athletes competing in the Diamond League disciplines earned extra compensation and points which went towards qualifying for one of two Diamond League finals (either Zürich or Brussels depending on the discipline). First place earned 8 points, with each step down in place earning one less point than the previous, until no points are awarded in 9th place or lower.

Men

Women

Non-Diamond League results

Men

Women

Mixed

See also
2019 Weltklasse Zürich (first half of the Diamond League final)
2019 Memorial Van Damme (second half of the Diamond League final)

References

Results
"Results golden gala pietro mennea". IAAF Diamond League (2019-06-06). Retrieved 2021-04-17.

External links
Official Diamond League Golden Gala website

Golden Gala
Golden Gala
June 2019 sports events in Italy
Golden Gala